Asnières-sur-Seine is a railway station in the town Asnières-sur-Seine, Hauts-de-Seine department, in the northwestern suburbs of Paris, France. It is on the Paris–Le Havre railway, and is served by Transilien Lines L and J from Gare Saint-Lazare.

References

External links

 

Railway stations in Hauts-de-Seine
Railway stations in France opened in 1838